Tyson Wash is one of the larger eastern-bank dry washes that enter the Colorado River in western Arizona. It drains the La Posa Plain south-to-north and is also coincident with the Plain's southern two thirds.

It is also the southwest drainage of a pair of drainages, the other being the Bouse Wash drainage. They are in the Lower Colorado River Valley, south of Parker, Arizona and both enter the region east of the Colorado River, with no Colorado River confluence; they both end at regions on the eastern border of the Colorado River Indian Reservation located along the Colorado River in the Parker Valley.

The two drainages, the Tyson and the Bouse, enter upper regions of the Imperial Reservoir Drainage.

Description

La Posa Plain
Quartzsite, Arizona and four mountain ranges to the south, including western regions of the Kofa National Wildlife Refuge, all drain north into Tyson Wash. The Tyson Wash forms a water divide on the south as the  Castle Dome Wash and Plain drain to the south and southwest.

Tyson Wash drains northward on the western perimeter of the La Posa Plain; the Trigo Mountains are southwest, and in the north the wash turns west around the north end of the Dome Rock Mountains-(see Table).

The La Posa Plain turns northwest to meet the Colorado River, and the south of the Parker Valley; Tyson Wash remains to the left (southwest) of the plain's direction and enters land abutting the southeast of the Colorado River Indian Reservation.

Communities
The community of Quartzsite is located on the central-north section of the wash and east-central Dome Rock Mountains; Granite Mountain south of Interstate 10 and part of southwest Quartzsite, has drainage washes feeding into Quartzsite proper. The entire Quatzsite region is a winter visitor region noted for its winter population of recreational vehicles and for its rockhounding activities because of old mines, mineralized mountains, and mild winter temperatures. An annual bazaar is held focussed partially on Rocks and Minerals. Numerous access routes to the wash and mountain areas surround Quartzsite.

Access from north

Table sequence of landforms
The landforms surrounding the Tyson Wash section of the southern La Posa Plain:

Three plains converge at the north of the La Posa Plain. The Ranegras Plain from the southeast contains Bouse Wash. The Cactus Plain is in the center. The three plain region is bordered on the northeast by parallel mountain ranges and valleys referred to as the Maria fold and thrust belt. The entire belt region contains about thirty landforms of plains, valleys, and mountain ranges.

External links
Tyson Wash Watershed Map
Bouse Wash Watershed Map
Imperial Reservoir Watershed Map

Washes of Arizona
Tributaries of the Lower Colorado River in Arizona
Rivers of La Paz County, Arizona
Rivers of Yuma County, Arizona